The Camak Subdivision is a railroad line owned by CSX Transportation in the U.S. State of Georgia. At its north end it continues south from the Camak Yard and at its south end the track comes to an end.

See also
 List of CSX Transportation lines

References

CSX Transportation lines